Spojil is a municipality and village in Pardubice District in the Pardubice Region of the Czech Republic. It has about 500 inhabitants.

Geography
Spojil forms an enclave in the territory of the city of Pardubice. It lies in a flat landscape of the East Elbe Table lowland.

History
Spojil is quite young among Czech villages as it was founded in 1785 at the site of two former fish ponds named Spojil and Strejček.

The village was part of Pardubice from 1961 until 1991.

Sights
There is only one minor sight, the Chapel of the Assumption of the Virgin Mary built in 1868.

Gallery

References

External links

Villages in Pardubice District
Populated places established in 1785